Steven Schachter is an American television, theatre, and film director and screenwriter.

Much of Schachter's success stems from projects on which he has collaborated with William H. Macy. The two co-wrote the cable television movies The Con (1998), A Slight Case of Murder (1999), Door to Door (2002), and The Wool Cap (2004), all of which Schachter directed and in which Macy starred. He also has directed numerous other made-for-TV movies, including an adaptation of David Mamet's play The Water Engine, which he had directed at the off-Broadway Public Theater in 1977 and again at the Plymouth Theatre on Broadway the following year. In 2006 he directed the TV movie The Mermaid Chair.

Schachter's latest projects also involve Macy. In May 2007, he completed filming the feature The Deal, written by and starring Macy, which is scheduled for release in 2008. The two are collaborating on Family Man, a pilot for a TNT series in which Macy would portray a model husband and father of three who unbeknownst to his family leads a gang of burglars.

Filmography

Television films

Television series

Theatrical films

As theatrical director

Awards and nominations
Awards
1999 Lone Star Film & Television Award for Best TV Teleplay (The Con)
2000 Edgar Allan Poe Award for Best Television Feature or Miniseries (A Slight Case of Murder)
2003 Emmy Award for Outstanding Directing for a Miniseries, Movie or a Dramatic Special (Door to Door)
2003 Emmy Award for Outstanding Writing for a Miniseries, Movie or a Dramatic Special (Door to Door)

Nominations
2003 Humanitas Prize for Writing, Television Movie 90 Minutes or Longer (Door to Door)
2003 Writers Guild of America Award (Door to Door)
2005 Emmy Award for Outstanding Made for Television Movie (The Wool Cap)
2005 Writers Guild of America Award (The Wool Cap)

External links

American male screenwriters
American film directors
American television directors
American theatre directors
Primetime Emmy Award winners
Living people
Year of birth missing (living people)